The 1998–1999 Highland Football League was won by Peterhead. Fort William finished bottom.

Table

Highland Football League seasons
5